The Revolutionary Armed Forces of the People or FARP are the national military of Guinea-Bissau.  They consist of an Army, Navy, Air Force and paramilitary forces. The World Bank estimated that there were around 4,000 personnel in the Armed Forces. The estimated military expenditure are $23.3 million, and military spending as a percentage of GDP as 1.7%

The World Fact Book  reports that the military service age and obligation is 18–25 years of age for selective compulsory military service; 16 years of age or younger with parental consent, for voluntary service (2009).

Internal culture

2010 Guinea-Bissau military unrest

Major General Batista Tagme Na Waie was chief of staff of the Guinea-Bissau armed forces until his assassination in 2009.

Military unrest occurred in Guinea-Bissau on 1 April 2010. Prime Minister Carlos Gomes Júnior was placed under house arrest by soldiers, who also detained Army Chief of Staff Zamora Induta. Supporters of Gomes and his party, PAIGC, reacted to the move by demonstrating in the capital, Bissau; Antonio Indjai, the Deputy Chief of Staff, then warned that he would have Gomes killed if the protests continued.

The EU ended its mission to reform the country's security forces, EU SSR Guinea-Bissau, on 4 August 2010,  a risk that may further embolden powerful generals and drug traffickers in the army and elsewhere. The EU mission's spokesman in Guinea-Bissau said the EU had to suspend its programme when the mastermind of the mutiny, General Antonio Indjai, became army chief of staff. "The EU mission thinks this is a breach in the constitutional order. We can't work with him".

International drug trade 
The multitude of small offshore islands and a military able to sidestep government with impunity has made it a favourite trans-shipment point for drugs to Europe. Aircraft drop payloads on or near the islands, and speedboats pick up bales to go direct to Europe or onshore. UN chief Ban Ki-moon has called for sanctions against those involved in Guinea-Bissau's drugs trade.

Air Force head Ibraima Papa Camara and former navy chief Jose Americo Bubo Na Tchuto have been named "drug kingpins".

Angolan assistance 
Angola, at the presidency of the Community of Portuguese Language Countries (CPLP) since 2010, has since 2011 participated in a military mission in Guinea-Bissau (MISSANG) to assist in the reform of defence and security.
MISSANG had a strength of 249 Angolan men (both soldiers and police officers), following an agreement signed between the defence ministers of both countries, as a complement to a Governmental accord ratified by both parliaments.

The Angolan assistance mission included a programme of technical and military cooperation focused on a reform of the Guinean armed forces and police, including the repair of barracks and police stations, organisation of administrative services and technical and military training locally and in Angolan institutions. The mission was halted by the Angolan Government, following a politico-military crisis that led to the ousting of the interim president of Guinea- Bissau, Raimundo Pereira, and the prime minister, Gomes Júnior. By 22 June 2012, the Angolan vessel Rio M'bridge, carrying the mission's equipment, had arrived back in Luanda.

Army equipment

Air Force

After achieving independence from Portugal, the air force was formed by officers returning from training in Cuba and the USSR. The FAGB was re-equipped by the Soviet Union with a limited aid package in which its first combat aircraft were introduced.

Navy
In September 2010, Rear-Admiral Jose Americo Bubo Na Tchuto attempted a coup, but was arrested after failing to gain support. "Guinea-Bissau's navy chief, who was arrested last week and accused of trying to stage a coup, has escaped custody and fled to nearby Gambia, the armed forces said on Tuesday."

References

 The Two Faces of War
 ''World Aircraft Information Files. Brightstar Publishing, London. File 338 Sheet 02

Further reading 
B Embaló, Civil–military relations and political order in Guinea-Bissau, The Journal of Modern African Studies, 2012
Shaw, Mark, Drug trafficking in Guinea-Bissau, 1998-2014: the evolution of an elite protection network, The Journal of Modern African Studies, Vol. 53.3 (Sep 2015): 339–364.

External links
http://africansecuritysector.blogspot.com/2010/09/guinee-bissau-restructuration-de-larmee.html, September 2010
United Nations, Report of the Secretary-General on UNIOGBIS, S/2010/550, 25 October 2010. UNIOGBIS is the former United Nations Peacebuilding Support Office in Guinea-Bissau (UNOGBIS) and is closely involved in reform of the armed forces.
http://www.slateafrique.com/85917/secrets-de-la-crise-bissau-guineenne

 
Government of Guinea-Bissau